Dionysius Lardner "Dion" Boucicault  (né Boursiquot; 26 December 1820 – 18 September 1890) was an Irish actor and playwright famed for his melodramas.  By the later part of the 19th century, Boucicault had become known on both sides of the Atlantic as one of the most successful actor-playwright-managers then in the English-speaking theatre.  Although The New York Times hailed him in his obituary as "the most conspicuous English dramatist of the 19th century," he and his second wife, Agnes Robertson Boucicault, had applied for and received American citizenship in 1873.

Life and career

Early life
Boucicault was born Dionysius Lardner Boursiquot in Dublin, where he lived with his family on Gardiner Street. His mother was Anne Darley, sister of the poet and mathematician George Darley. The Darleys were an important Anglo-Irish Dublin family influential in many fields and related to the Guinnesses by marriage. Anne was married to Samuel Smith Boursiquot, of Huguenot ancestry, but the identity of the boy's father is uncertain. He was probably Dionysius Lardner, a lodger at his mother's house at a time when she was recently separated from her husband. Lardner later gave Dion Boucicault financial support until about 1840.

In 1828, Lardner was elected as professor of natural philosophy and astronomy at University College, London, a position he held until he resigned in 1831. Anne Boursiquot followed him to London in 1828, taking all but one of her children with her. 

Consequently, from then on Boucicault attended various schools in and around London, about which there is a good deal of confusion. Richard Fawkes has addressed this in a biography. For about four years, from 1829, Boucicault seems to have attended a very small private school in Hampstead kept by a Mr Hessey; between 1833 and 1835 he was at University College School, where he began his friendship with Charles Kenney. He later recalled having boarded in Euston Square with a Rev. Henry Stebbing, a historian. There is a gap of two years in the record, when Fawkes believes Boucicault may have attended Rowland Hill's Bruce Castle School, as stated in the Dictionary of National Biography. In 1837, he was enrolled at Wyke House, a school at Sion Hill, Brentford, kept by a Dr Alexander Jamieson. There he appeared in a school play, in the part of Rolla in Sheridan's Pizarro, and wrote his own first play, The Old Guard, which was produced some years later. After that, according to some accounts he attended a school in Dublin, before returning to London as an apprentice civil engineer to Lardner.

Work as actor and playwright
Boucicault abandoned his apprenticeship to take up an acting offer in Cheltenham, adopting the stage name of Lee Morton. He joined William Charles Macready and made his first appearance on stage with Benjamin Webster at Bristol. Soon after this he began to write plays, occasionally in conjunction with his acting.

Boucicault's first play, A Legend of the Devil's Dyke, opened in Brighton in 1838. Three years later, he had a big success as a dramatist with London Assurance. First produced at Covent Garden on 4 March 1841, its cast included such well-known actors as Charles Mathews, William Farren, Mrs Nesbitt and Madame Vestris.

Boucicault rapidly followed this with a number of other plays, among the most successful being The Bastile , an "after-piece" (1842), Old Heads and Young Hearts (1844), The School for Scheming (1847), Confidence (1848), and The Knight Arva (1848), all produced at Her Majesty's Theatre. He had further great successes with The Corsican Brothers (1852, for Charles Kean) and Louis XI (1855), both adaptations of French plays.

In his The Vampire (1852), Boucicault made his début as a leading actor, appearing as the vampire Sir Alan Raby. Although the play itself had mixed reviews, Boucicault's characterisation was praised as "a dreadful and weird thing played with immortal genius". In 1854 he wrote Andy Blake; or, The Irish Diamond and also appeared in it, playing the title character.

From 1854 to 1860, Boucicault resided in the United States, where he was always a popular favourite. Boucicault and his actress wife, Agnes Robertson, toured America. He also wrote many successful plays there, acting in most of them. These included the popular Jessie Brown; or, The Relief of Lucknow in 1858.

Work as theatre manager and producer
From around 1855 his business manager and partner in New York was William Stuart, an expatriate Irish MP and adventurer. Together they leased Wallack's Theatre in 1855-1856, and put on a short season at the Washington Theatre in Washington D.C.

In late 1855, while his wife was performing in St. Louis, Boucicault became the lessee of the Varieties Theatre in New Orleans. He quickly renamed it the Gaity and was set to open its doors on the 28th of November. A short delay pushed the opening night back to  December 1 with his play Used Up. During his stay in New Orleans, a false report of his death began to circulate, this rumor was proven false when days later on December 20 he presented The Chameleon at the Gaiety. This was the first appearance of Agnes Robertson at the Gaiety. Shortly after, on February 26 of 1856 Boucicualt was in the market to sell his lease. By March 8 he was out and heading to New York.

In the summer of 1859, Boucicault and William Stuart became joint lessees of Burton's New Theatre (originally Tripler's Theatre) on Broadway just below Amity Street. After extensive remodeling, he renamed his new showplace the Winter Garden Theatre.  There on 5 December 1859, he premiered his new sensation, the anti-slavery potboiler The Octoroon, in which he also starred. This was the first play to treat seriously the Black American population.

Boucicault fell out with Stuart over money matters, and he went back to England. On his return he produced at the Adelphi Theatre a dramatic adaptation of Gerald Griffin's novel, The Collegians, entitled The Colleen Bawn. This play, one of the most successful of the times, was performed in almost every city of the United Kingdom and the United States. Julius Benedict used it as the basis for his Opera The Lily of Killarney. Although it made its author a handsome fortune, he lost it in the management of various London theatres.

After his return to England, Boucicault was asked by the noted American comedian Joseph Jefferson, who also starred in the production of Octoroon, to rework Jefferson's adaptation of Washington Irving's Rip van Winkle. Their play opened in London in 1865 and on Broadway in 1866.

Boucicault's next marked success was at the Princess's Theatre, London in 1864 with Arrah-na-Pogue in which he played the part of a County Wicklow, Ireland carman. This, and his admirable creation of "Conn" in his play The Shaughraun (first produced at Wallacks Theatre, New York City, in 1874, then at the Theatre Royal, Drury Lane in 1875), won him the reputation of being the best "Stage Irishman" of his time. His reputation was also mentioned by W. S. Gilbert in the libretto of his 1881 operetta Patience in the line: "The pathos of Paddy, as rendered by Boucicault".

Again in partnership with William Stuart he built the New Park Theatre in 1873–1874. However, Boucicault withdrew just before the theatre opened, and Stuart teamed up instead with the actor, playwright and theatre manager Charles Fechter to run the house.

In 1875 Boucicault returned to New York City, where he made his home and for a time his manager was Harry J. Sargent. He wrote the melodrama Contempt of Court (poster, left) in 1879, but he paid occasional visits to London and elsewhere (e.g. Toronto). He made his last appearance in London in his play, The Jilt, in 1885.

Boucicault was an excellent actor, especially in pathetic parts. His uncanny ability to play these low-status roles earned him the nickname "Little Man Dion" in theatrical circles. His plays are for the most part adaptations, but are often very ingenious in construction. They have had great popularity.

Family life
Boucicault was married three times. He married the much older Anne Guiot at St Mary-at-Lambeth on 9 July 1845. He claimed that she died in a Swiss mountaineering accident later in the same year, though she may in fact have died as late as 1848. In 1853, he eloped with Agnes Kelly Robertson (1833–1916) to marry in New York. She was Charles Kean's ward; the juvenile lead in his company and an actress of unusual ability. She would bear Dion six children: Dion William Boucicault (1855–1876); Eva Boucicault (1857–1909); Dion Jr. (1859–1929); Patrice Boucicault (1862–1890); Nina Boucicault (1867–1950); Aubrey (1868–1913); three of whom became distinguished actors in their own right. Patrice became a society singer, marrying George Pitman in 1885 but died in childbirth in 1890. His granddaughter Rene Boucicault (1898–1935), Aubrey's daughter, became an actress and acted in silent films.

Between 11 July and 8 October 1885, Boucicault toured Australia, where his brother Arthur lived. Towards the end of this tour, he suddenly left Agnes to marry Josephine Louise Thorndyke (c. 1864–1956), a young actress, on 9 September 1885, in Sydney. This aroused scandal on both sides of the Atlantic Ocean, as his marriage to Agnes was not finally dissolved until 21 June 1888, by reason of "bigamy with adultery." The rights to many of his plays were later sold to finance alimony payments to his second wife.

His last play, A Tale of a Coat, opened at Daly's Theatre in New York on 14 August 1890, and closed on 13 September 1890.

Boucicault died in 1890 in New York City, and was buried in Mount Hope Cemetery, Hastings, Westchester County, New York.

Selected works

London Assurance (1841)
The Bastile  (1842)
Old Heads and Young Hearts (1844)
The School for Scheming (1847)
Confidence (1848)
The Knight Arva (1848)
The Corsican Brothers (1852)
The Vampire (1852)
Louis XI (1855)
The Phantom (1856)
The Poor of New York (1857)
The Octoroon or Life in Louisiana (1859)
The Colleen Bawn or The Brides of Garryowen (1860)
Jeanie Deans (1860)
Arrah-na-Pogue (1864)
Rip van Winkle or The Sleep of Twenty Years (1865)
After Dark: A Tale of London Life (1868)
Formosa, The Most Beautiful or The Railroad to Ruin (1869)
The Shaughraun (1874)
The Jilt (1885)

See also
Dionysius Lardner (probably Boucicault's natural father)
See a man about a dog

References
Notes

Bibliography
Asimov's Annotated Gilbert & Sullivan, Patience, note 31
 Michael Diamond, Victorian Sensation, (Anthem Press, 2003) .  Chapter 7.
 Richard Fawkes, Dion Boucicault (Quartet books, 1979)

External links

 
 
Theater Arts Manuscripts: An Inventory of the Collection at the Harry Ransom Center
 
The Fawkes Boucicault Collection at the University of Kent
Dion Boucicault Theatre Collection at the University of South Florida
Dion Boucicault Digital Collection at the University of South Florida

Irish male dramatists and playwrights
Irish male stage actors
American male dramatists and playwrights
American male stage actors
Male actors from Dublin (city)
People educated at University College School
People educated at Bruce Castle School
1822 births
1890 deaths
19th-century Irish dramatists and playwrights
19th-century Irish male actors
19th-century American dramatists and playwrights
19th-century American male actors